Edward M. Sharpe (December 18, 1887 – March 3, 1975) was a justice of the Michigan Supreme Court from 1934 to 1957.

Born on a farm in Bay County, Michigan, Sharpe attended the public schools and the Ferris Institute, and received a law degree from the University of Michigan Law School in 1914.

In 1933, Sharpe defeated incumbent John S. McDonald to be elected to the supreme court.

References

Justices of the Michigan Supreme Court
1887 births
1975 deaths
University of Michigan Law School alumni
20th-century American judges